John Leslie Sissons (born 30 September 1945) is an English former footballer who played for West Ham United, Sheffield Wednesday, Norwich City and Chelsea.

Career
Sissons started his career as an apprentice for West Ham United in 1961. He joined the club along with Peter Bennett after the pair were spotted by scout Charlie Faulkner while playing for Middlesex Schoolboys. He played for England Youth in the 1964 UEFA European Under-18 Championship and scored the fourth goal in the Final, a 4–0 win over Spain at the Olympic Stadium in Amsterdam.

He had played as an inside-left for Middlesex and England Schoolboys, but was moved to outside-left by Hammers manager Ron Greenwood. He made his senior debut for the east London club on 4 May 1963, a home game against Blackburn Rovers. Sissons became the youngest player to score in an FA Cup Final at Wembley, in May 1964, and second youngest to appear, behind his Preston North End counterpart Howard Kendall. He went on to play 213 league (37 goals) and 52 cup (16 goals) games for West Ham.

Sissons moved to Wednesday in 1970 for £60,000. He made 115 league appearances for the club, scoring 14 goals, before moving to Norwich City, where he rejoined former teammate John Bond.

Chelsea signed Sissons for £70,000 from Norwich in August 1974. He made his debut on 17 August 1974 in a 0–2 home defeat by Carlisle United. He made 11 appearances during the 1974–75 season but failed to establish himself in a struggling Chelsea side who were relegated at the end of the season. In March 1975, he joined up with North American Soccer League club Tampa Bay Rowdies. He was part of the championship-winning team which featured other English exports Clyde Best, Stewart Jump, Stewart Scullion, Paul Hammond and Mark Lindsay.

After his release from Chelsea, Sissons emigrated to South Africa and finished his career with two seasons at Cape Town City.

Career statistics

Honours
West Ham United
FA Cup: 1963–64
FA Charity Shield: 1964
European Cup Winners' Cup: 1964–65

References

External links 

Tampa Bay Rowdies profile

Sissons, John
Sissons, John
Chelsea F.C. players
English footballers
England under-23 international footballers
Association football forwards
North American Soccer League (1968–1984) players
Norwich City F.C. players
Sissons, John
Sissons, John
Tampa Bay Rowdies (1975–1993) players
English Football League players
West Ham United F.C. players
Cape Town City F.C. (NFL) players
Expatriate soccer players in South Africa
English expatriate sportspeople in the United States
Expatriate soccer players in the United States
English expatriate footballers
FA Cup Final players
English expatriate sportspeople in South Africa
National Football League (South Africa) players